Prime series is a digital television channel, one of seven owned by Prime, part of Telenet. The channel, which is viewable only in Belgium, chiefly shows drama series made elsewhere by, amongst others, Home Box Office (HBO) and the American Broadcasting Company (ABC).

Most programs can be viewed again by way of the Prime à la carte on-demand facility.

References

Television channels in Flanders
Television channels in Belgium
Liberty Global